The Neats were a Boston rock band that existed from the late 1970s to early 1990s. They first recorded for the independent Propeller label, which in 1981 released the song, "Six", a swirling, Vox-washed slab of garage rock reminiscent of Question Mark & the Mysterians. The following year, their well-received debut, 7-song EP, The Monkey's Head in the Corner of the Room, was released on Boston's Ace of Hearts Records. It was voted one of the best EPs of 1982 in the Village Voice's annual Pazz & Jop poll. Three full-length albums followed.  The band featured well-crafted songs and a psychedelic power pop sound in a similar vein as The Dream Syndicate and The Feelies. They occasionally played on the same bill as Mission of Burma; they once toured nationally with R.E.M.

Members
Eric Martin – Guitar, Vocals, Harmonica, Vox Organ
Phil Caruso – Guitar, Vocals
Jerry Channell – Bass, Vocals
Jay Parham – Bass, Vocals (replaced Jerry Channell)
David Lee – Bass, guitar (Replaced Jay Parham)
Terry Hanley – Drums

Contributed on Crash at Crush
Ted Pine – Keyboards, Vocals
Dave "Bone" Pedersen – Vocals
Stona Fitch – Accordion, Vocals
Joe Harvard – Guitar, Vocals
Akshay Obhrai – Banjo, vocals

Discography

EPs
 The Monkey's Head in the Corner of the Room (Ace of Hearts 1982)

Albums
 Neats (Ace of Hearts 1983)
 Crash at Crush (Coyote – Twin/Tone 1987)
 Blues End Blue (Coyote - Twin/Tone 1989)

Compilations
 "NEATS" 1981-84 The Ace Of Hearts Years (Ace of Hearts 2009)
 "Six" appears on DIY: Mass. Ave. – The Boston Scene (1975–83) (Rhino 1993) 
 "Six" appears on Propeller Product  – 7" 33⅓ rpm EP (Propeller 1981)
 "Do the Things" and a live version of "Another Broken Dream" appears on a Propeller Cassette Tape, sold by Newbury Comics in Boston (Propeller 1981)

Sources 

 Rock in Boston website

Alternative rock groups from Massachusetts
Musical groups from Boston
American post-punk music groups